Lachlan Oliver Neale (born 24 May 1993) is an Australian rules footballer and the co-captain of the Brisbane Lions in the Australian Football League (AFL). He previously played for the Fremantle Football Club from 2012 to 2018 before being traded to the Brisbane Lions in 2019 where he won the 2020 Brownlow Medal.

Early life
Neale was born in Naracoorte, South Australia. His family briefly moved to a farm in Langkoop, near Apsley, a small town just west of the South Australian border in western Victoria. before settling in Kybybolite, South Australia when Lachie was still young. 

Nicknamed 'Cowboy', after Kevin Neale, he played various junior sports in Naracoorte including basketball, soccer, cricket and football. Lachie started playing football for Kybybolite in 2004 as a 10-year-old. He kicked 8 goals for the year as his team won the under 14 KNTFL premiership alongside future AFL player Jack Trengove. Neale also won another under 14 premiership the next season once again alongside Trengove but also with future AFL teammate Alex Forster. Neale kicked 14 goals for the season but was not selected for the Grand Final. Lachie continued playing for Kybybolite and then received a scholarship to attend St Peter's College, Adelaide. He won the Opie Medal in his final year at St Peter's. 

He played his junior football for the Kybybolite Football Club and then the Glenelg Football Club in the South Australian National Football League (SANFL), including seven games in the league side before returning to the Under-18 team for the Grand Final. Despite Glenelg losing to Port Adelaide, he gathered 40 possessions and was awarded the Alan Stewart Medal as the best player in the game. He represented South Australia at the 2011 AFL Under 18 Championships.

Growing up, Neale supported the Port Adelaide Football Club.

AFL career

Fremantle (2012-2018)
Neale's close friend and former teammate from Kybybolite Junior Football Club, Alex Forster, was also drafted by Fremantle with their previous selection in the same draft. They joined former  co-captain and Port Adelaide player Jack Trengove as ex-Kybybolite players on AFL lists.

Neale played very well during the 2012 NAB Cup preseason games and was predicted to make his AFL debut in the opening round of the 2012 AFL season, but hurt his ankle against Port Adelaide at Victor Harbor, South Australia.

After playing two games for Swan Districts in the West Australian Football League (WAFL), Neale made his debut in round 4 of the 2012 AFL season against St Kilda at Etihad Stadium as the substitute. He was activated during the third quarter, replacing Nick Suban. After his debut, Neale played through until round 14. He played one further game in round 20. Across the season, he averaged 11.3 disposals, 1.6 marks and 2.1 tackles per game.

In the 2013 season he improved, averaging 19.8 disposals, 3.3 marks and 1.7 tackles per game. Neale was the substitute in the 2013 AFL Grand Final when Fremantle lost to Hawthorn by 15 points.

Neale's 2016 season was rewarded with the Doig Medal as the club best and fairest.

Brisbane Lions (2019-)

At the conclusion of the 2018 season, after winning a second Doig Medal, Neale requested a trade to Brisbane. He was traded on 17 October. Neale thrived at his new club in 2019, winning All-Australian team selection for the first time, winning his first Merrett-Murray Medal and finishing equal-third in the Brownlow Medal with 26 votes.

Neale had an excellent start to the 2020 season, with him being deemed the best player in the league by the ABC's Dean Bilton prior to round 6.

Neale won the 2020 Brownlow Medal after polling 31 votes during the shortened regular season, including being best-on-ground in ten matches. This result put Neale in front of 2nd-placed Travis Boak by 10 votes, the equal highest win in Brownlow Medal history since the introduction of the 3-2-1 voting system.

Neale's 2020 season success was also compounded by All-Australian selection, a Merrett-Murray Medal and the Leigh Matthews Trophy, amongst various other awards.

Neale's 2022 season was yet another season of success, taking home a third All-Australian blazer and winning a third Merrett-Murray Medal, as well as placing second in the Brownlow Medal, missing out on first place by a singular vote.

On 1 March 2023, Neale was named co-captain of the Lions alongside Harris Andrews.

Statistics
Updated to the end of the 2022 season.

|-
| 2012 ||  || 27
| 11 || 4 || 2 || 51 || 73 || 124 || 18 || 23 || 0.4 || 0.2 || 4.6 || 6.6 || 11.3 || 1.6 || 2.1 || 0
|-
| 2013 ||  || 27
| 12 || 8 || 4 || 111 || 126 || 237 || 40 || 20 || 0.7 || 0.3 || 9.2 || 10.5 || 19.8 || 3.3 || 1.7 || 1
|-
| 2014 ||  || 27
| 23 || 8 || 10 || 242 || 298 || 540 || 91 || 76 || 0.4 || 0.4 || 10.5 || 13.0 || 23.5 || 4.0 || 3.3 || 7
|-
| 2015 ||  || 27
| 24 || 16 || 10 || 320 || 338 || 658 || 114 || 86 || 0.7 || 0.4 || 13.3 || 14.1 || 27.4 || 4.8 || 3.6 || 10
|-
| 2016 ||  || 27
| 22 || 7 || 4 || 289 || 448 || 737 || 90 || 101 || 0.3 || 0.2 || 13.1 || bgcolor="CAE1FF"| 20.4† || bgcolor="CAE1FF"| 33.5† || 4.1 || 4.6 || 20
|-
| 2017 ||  || 27
| 21 || 14 || 6 || 245 || 327 || 572 || 94 || 94 || 0.7 || 0.3 || 11.7 || 15.6 || 27.2 || 4.5 || 4.5 || 14
|-
| 2018 ||  || 27
| 22 || 10 || 6 || 251 || 416 || 667 || 79 || 93 || 0.5 || 0.3 || 11.4 || 18.9 || 30.3 || 3.6 || 4.2 || 11
|- 
| 2019 ||  || 9
| 24 || 12 || 7 || 301 || 441 || 742 || 98 || 90 || 0.5 || 0.3 || 12.5 || 18.4 || 30.9 || 4.1 || 3.8 || 26
|-
| 2020 ||  || 9
| 19 || 14 || 13 || 249 || 262 || bgcolor=CAE1FF | 511† || 80 || 59 || 0.7 || 0.7 || 13.1 || 13.8 || 26.9 || 4.2 || 3.1 || bgcolor="98FB98" | 31±
|- 
| 2021 ||  || 9
| 17 || 8 || 6 || 220 || 239 || 459 || 66 || 70 || 0.5 || 0.3 || 12.9 || 14.1 || 27.0 || 3.8 || 4.1 || 8
|-
| 2022 ||  || 9
| 25 || 11 || 8 || 346 || 403 || 749 || 96 || 113 || 0.4 || 0.3 || 13.8 || 16.1 || 29.9 || 3.8 || 4.5 || 28
|- class=sortbottom
! colspan=3 | Career
! 220 !! 112 !! 76 !! 2625 !! 3371 !! 5996 !! 865 !! 824 !! 0.5 !! 0.3 !! 11.9 !! 15.3 !! 27.2 !! 3.9 !! 3.7 !! 156
|}

Notes

Honours and achievements
Team
 McClelland Trophy: 2015

Individual
 Brownlow Medal: 2020
 Leigh Matthews Trophy: 2020
 AFLCA Champion Player of the Year Award: 2020
 3× All-Australian team: 2019, 2020, 2022
 3× Merrett–Murray Medal: 2019, 2020, 2022
 2× Doig Medal: 2016, 2018
 2× Geoff Christian Medal: 2016, 2018
 3× Glendinning–Allan Medal: 2014, 2015, 2018
 22under22 team: 2015
 Marcus Ashcroft Medal: 2020

References

External links

WAFL Statistics

1993 births
Living people
Fremantle Football Club players
Brisbane Lions players
Glenelg Football Club players
Swan Districts Football Club players
Brownlow Medal winners
Doig Medal winners
Merrett–Murray Medal winners
Leigh Matthews Trophy winners
All-Australians (AFL)
Australian rules footballers from South Australia
People educated at St Peter's College, Adelaide